The Flight Stakes is an Australian Turf Club Group 1 Thoroughbred horse race for three-year-old fillies, at Set Weights, run over a distance of 1600 metres at Randwick Racecourse, Sydney, Australia in early October. Total prize money for the race is A$750,000.

History
The race is named for champion Australian Hall of Fame mare Flight, the winner of the W. S. Cox Plate in 1945 and 1946. The race is part of the Epsom Handicap racecard.

Grade
 1947–1978 - Principal Race
 1979–1984 - Group 2
 1985 onwards - Group 1

Distance
 1947–1971 - 1 mile (~1600 metres)
 1972 onwards - 1600 metres

Venue
 1947–1982 - Randwick Racecourse
 1983 - Warwick Farm Racecourse
 1984–2000 - Randwick Racecourse
 2001 - Warwick Farm Racecourse
 2012 onwards - Randwick Racecourse

Winners

 2022 - Zougotcha
 2021 - Never Been Kissed
 2020 - Montefilia
 2019 - Funstar
 2018 - Oohood
 2017 - Alizee
 2016 - Global Glamour
 2015 - Speak Fondly
 2014 - First Seal
 2013 - Guelph
 2012 - Norzita
 2011 - Streama
 2010 - Secret Admirer
 2009 - More Joyous
	2008 - Samantha Miss
 2007 - ‡race not held
 2006 - Cheeky Choice
 2005 - Fashions Afield
 2004 - Lotteria
 2003 - Unearthly
 2002 - Royal Purler
 2001 - Ha Ha
 2000 - Unworldly
 1999 - Danglissa
 1998 - Sunline
 1997 - Only A Lady
 1996 - †Assertive Lass / Dashing Eagle
 1995 - Pontal Lass
 1994 - Danarani
 1993 - Angst
 1992 - Slight Chance
 1991 - Electrique
 1990 - Triscay
 1989 - A Little Kiss
 1988 - Research
 1987 - Judyann
 1986 - Bounding Away
 1985 - Tingo Tango
 1984 - Goleen
 1983 - La Caissiere
 1982 - Gelsomino
 1981 - Allez Show
 1980 - Fiancee
 1979 - Snowing
 1978 - Jubilee Walk
 1977 - Sun Sally
 1976 - Apollua
 1975 - Gloomy Isle
 1974 - Cap D'Antibes
 1973 - Better Comment
 1972 - Siduri
 1971 - Better Gleam
 1970 - Tropic Jewel
 1969 - Natal Lass
 1968 - Flying Fable
 1967 - Flying Gauntlet
 1966 - Candy Floss
 1965 - Fawnia
 1964 - Reveille
 1963 - Slepsie
 1962 - Jan's Image
 1961 - Hoa Hine
 1960 - Wenona Girl
 1959 - Weeamera
 1958 - Straightlaced
 1957 - Amneris
 1956 - French Fable
 1955 - Brimses
 1954 - Travel Free
 1953 - Redeswood
 1952 - Bush Chapel
 1951 - Blue's Sister
 1950 - Putoko
 1949 - Mona's Choice
 1948 - Wattle
 1947 - Nizam's Ring

† Dead heat
‡ Not held because of outbreak of equine influenza

References

Flat horse races for three-year-old fillies
Group 1 stakes races in Australia
Randwick Racecourse